Missandei, also known as Missandei of Naath, is a fictional character in the American television series Game of Thrones and the fantasy novel series A Song of Ice and Fire by American author George R. R. Martin. Missandei is a former slave who comes into the service of Daenerys Targaryen during the latter's conquest of Essos. She serves as one of Daenerys's most trusted counselors during her rule in Meereen.

Missandei is portrayed by Nathalie Emmanuel in the HBO television adaptation, where her role is greatly expanded from that in the books.

Character

Background
As children, Missandei and her three brothers are captured by raiders from the Basilisk Isles and sold into slavery in Astapor. Missandei's talent for learning languages easily is noticed by the masters of Astapor, who train her as a scribe. Missandei's brothers Marselen and Mossador are made into Unsullied (the third brother is also made into an Unsullied but dies during his training). Missandei is an interpreter who becomes a close confidante and trusted advisor to Daenerys Targaryen. She is from the island of Naath, off the coast of Sothoryos. She is also a polyglot who speaks nineteen languages.

Overview
Missandei first appears in the book series at the age of 10 in 2000's A Storm of Swords. In the television series, she was first introduced in the third season, already an adult in the role of a slave interpreter. She was noted as being one of the few characters of color, along with her love interest, Grey Worm. She eventually dies near the end of the television series, while Grey Worm and Daenerys look on.

Storylines

A Storm of Swords

Missandei is working as an interpreter for Astapori slaver Kraznys mo Nakloz when Daenerys Targaryen comes to inspect his army of Unsullied. After Daenerys strikes a bargain with the Good Masters of Astapor concerning payment for the Unsullied, Kraznys gives Missandei to Daenerys as an interpreter to give them commands. To Missandei's surprise, Daenerys frees her; having nowhere else to go, Missandei accepts Daenerys' offer to stay as her interpreter and handmaiden. Missandei subsequently accompanies Daenerys as she liberates the neighbouring cities of Yunkai and Meereen.

A Dance With Dragons

Missandei becomes Daenerys' herald, announcing her entry when she meets with the people of Meereen. After Mossador is killed by the Sons of the Harpy, Daenerys offers to let Missandei return to Naath; Missandei refuses, noting that she would be an easy target for slavers.

Following the reopening of the fighting pits and Daenerys' flight from Meereen with her dragon Drogon, Daenerys' new husband Hizdhar zo Loraq removes Missandei from her position as herald. With Daenerys' other servants Irri and Jhiqui joining the Dothraki in their search for Daenerys in the Dothraki Sea, Missandei is left as the only occupant in the Great Pyramid's royal apartments. When Barristan Selmy seizes control of Meereen, he has Missandei tend to the mortally wounded Quentyn Martell.

TV adaptation

Missandei was played by the British actress Nathalie Emmanuel in the television adaption. Her performance was nominated for multiple Screen Actors Guild Awards, as well as an Empire Award. Her portrayal of Missandei had many loyal fans, who would later react negatively to the character's death in Season 8. Emmanuel has discussed the importance of her character to fans, noting in particular the importance of portraying a strong woman of color in a successful television show. She has also discussed Missandei's romance with Grey Worm, calling it "endearing" and remarking on the pleasure of working with co-star Jacob Anderson.

Season 3
The story of Missandei in the third season of Game of Thrones closely tracks her story in A Storm of Swords. However, when Daenerys agrees to purchase Kraznys's Unsullied soldiers, she demands Missandei's services as part of the exchange; in the book, Kraznys gave her to Daenerys of his own accord.

Season 4
In season 4, Missandei befriends Grey Worm, the commander of the Unsullied, and gives him lessons in the Common Tongue. While bathing in a stream she witnesses Grey Worm watching her; although she covers herself, she later admits to Grey Worm that she is glad he saw her. She expresses sorrow that Grey Worm was castrated during his training, though Grey Worm notes that if he had not become an Unsullied soldier he never would have met her.

Season 5
In season 5, Grey Worm is gravely wounded in a skirmish with the Sons of the Harpy, and Missandei stands vigil by his side. When Grey Worm wakes he reveals to her that, in battle, he felt fear for the first time, fear that he would never see Missandei again; Missandei is clearly moved by his sentiment. When the Sons of the Harpy launch an attack at the reopening of the fighting pits, one of the Sons nearly kills Missandei before he is killed by Tyrion Lannister. Daenerys subsequently flies away on Drogon, and Daario Naharis decrees that Tyrion, Missandei, and Grey Worm should govern Meereen in her absence.

Season 6
To keep the peace with the slavers, Tyrion grants them seven years to transition from slavery. Although Missandei helps defend Tyrion's decision to the outraged Meereenese freedman, in private she warns Tyrion that the masters will betray him. She is eventually vindicated, when the slavers send a fleet to lay siege to Meereen. She accompanies Daenerys to a parley with the slavers' representatives. When Daenerys leaves on Drogon to destroy the fleet, Missandei tells the masters that Daenerys has ordered one of their deaths as punishment for their treachery, though when two of them offer up the third Grey Worm kills those two instead. Missandei later accompanies Daenerys and her forces as they sail to Westeros.

Season 7
Missandei is present throughout Daenerys's reclamation of her ancestral stronghold of Dragonstone. She presides over Jon Snow and Davos Seaworth's arrival at the island. Davos is quite taken with Missandei and inquires about her background, but she remains mysterious. Later, as the Unsullied prepare to leave for the seizure of Casterly Rock, Missandei goes to Grey Worm to talk about their feelings and the pair consummate their relationship. Missandei eventually reveals her entire backstory to Jon and Davos in an attempt to impress Daenerys' character upon them.

Season 8
Missandei travels with Daenerys' court to Winterfell. Feeling unwelcome amongst the Northerns, she and Grey Worm plan to sail to Naath after Daenerys wins the Iron Throne. During the Long Night, Missandei shelters in the crypts, and survives the Night King's reanimation of the dead Starks in the crypts. After the defeat of the White Walkers, she accompanies Daenerys' forces to Dragonstone, but they are ambushed by Euron Greyjoy's fleet and Missandei is taken prisoner and brought to Cersei Lannister in King's Landing. Tyrion, Daenerys, and Grey Worm journey to King's Landing and Tyrion begs Cersei to surrender, but Cersei has Gregor Clegane behead Missandei. She is later avenged by Sandor Clegane, who sacrifices himself to kill Gregor once and for all.

Reception
Missandei's death at the end of "The Last of the Starks" was criticized as a plot device to push Daenerys's descent into madness. Just before being beheaded by Gregor Clegane at Cersei's direction, Missandei shouts "Dracarys!" at Daenerys, who is standing just outside of the city of King's Landing backed by her army and her last fire-breathing dragon, Drogon. "Dracarys" is the command used to incite fire from a dragon in the series. Although many viewers considered Daenerys's transition into a mad conqueror to be poorly executed by the show's creators, she would go on in the next episode to use Drogon to destroy the city of King's Landing and kill all of its inhabitants. Missandei's death was viewed by some as an easy shortcut to Daenerys's improbable flip and the subsequent destruction of King's Landing.

Missandei's death has been described as an example of fridging. Although fridging typically describes a woman who is killed off in order to further a plot that revolves around a man, it also applies when a minority character is killed to serve the plot of a white character. Missandei's death was additionally controversial because she was one of few characters of color to appear in the series, and one of only two to make it to the episode in which she died. After her death, Grey Worm was the only character of color for the remainder of the series.

Recognition and awards

References

A Song of Ice and Fire characters
Black people in literature
Female characters in literature
Female characters in television
Fictional advisors
Literary characters introduced in 2000
Fictional revolutionaries
Fictional slaves
Fictional linguists
Television characters introduced in 2013
Fictional people sentenced to death